Jiuting is a station on Shanghai Metro Line 9. It began operation on December 29, 2007.  It is located in Jiuting Town of Songjiang District. Upon exiting the station through the south exit, there are a variety of small shops and restaurants in a mini-mall format, including McDonald's and KFC.

North Huting Road is the primary North-South street immediately adjacent to the station.  Traveling South will take you into old Jiuting downtown.  Traveling North will take you into a newer area with shops, apartment housing and restaurants.

Jiuting is approximately 15 minutes by taxi from Shanghai Hongqiao International Airport.

References

Railway stations in Shanghai
Shanghai Metro stations in Songjiang District
Railway stations in China opened in 2007
Line 9, Shanghai Metro